Turkey competed at the 2011 World Championships in Athletics from August 27 to September 4 in Daegu, South Korea.

Team selection

An initial team of 23 athletes was
announced to represent the country
in the event. In the absence of the 2010 European Athletics Championships
10000m Elvan Abeylegesse, who is missing this summer due to maternity, the team is led by the current European 5000m champion Alemitu Bekele.  The final team on the entry list comprises the names of 21 athletes.

The following athletes appeared on the preliminary Entry List, but not on the Official Start List of the specific event, resulting in a total number of 20 competitors:

Results

Men

Women

References

External links
Official local organising committee website
Official IAAF competition website

Nations at the 2011 World Championships in Athletics
2011 World Championships in Athletics
2011